Pleione pleionoides is a species of plant in the family Orchidaceae. It is endemic to south-central China and can be found in Hubei and Sichuan.

References

Endemic orchids of China
Flora of South-Central China
pleionoides
Vulnerable plants
Taxonomy articles created by Polbot